DNA-directed RNA polymerase I subunit RPA34 is an enzyme that in humans is encoded by the CD3EAP gene.

Interactions
CD3EAP has been shown to interact with T-cell surface glycoprotein CD3 epsilon chain, POLR1E and POLR1C.

References

Further reading

External links